Verdant Power is a maker and installer of tidal power and hydroelectric systems. Their primary device is an underwater turbine, similar to a three-bladed wind turbine, that is designed to capture energy from tidal currents and (precipitation-driven) river currents. The company uses the trade term "kinetic hydropower" to distinguish their systems from those (tidal and hydroelectric) based on dam construction. The company's first project, the Roosevelt Island Tidal Energy Project, is several turbines in New York City's East River.

Location
Verdant's home base is situated between Manhattan and Queens on Roosevelt Island in the middle of the East River, a tidal strait running from Long Island Sound to Upper New York Bay.

RITE Project
The Roosevelt Island Tidal Energy (RITE) Project, owned by Verdant Power, is the first tidal energy project to be issued a license from the Federal Energy Regulatory Commission (FERC). The first of three phases of the project was prototype testing from 2002 until 2006 when the phase 2 demonstration began. The six full-scale tidal turbines installed in the river bed constituted the "world's first operation of a grid-connected tidal turbine array". They provided power for a Gristedes supermarket and the adjacent Motorgate parking garage on Roosevelt Island.

In February 2012 the federal government announced an agreement with Verdant Power to install 30 tidal turbines in the channel, then projected to begin operations in 2015 and produce 1.05 MW of power. There were problems with turbine blade degradation. A September 2012 test of a newly designed 16-feet diameter turbine was a success, and the company estimated it will take about 5 years to complete the array of 30 turbines in the river. In August 2013, CBS News reported that Verdant planned to put "two more turbines in the river over the next year or two and build up from there". A platform with three turbines was installed in October 2020.

References

External links
Company website

Hydroelectricity in the United States
Renewable energy technology companies
Technology companies of the United States
Tidal power